Gente di mare is an Italian television series.

Cast

 Lorenzo Crespi as Angelo Sammarco
 Vanessa Gravina  as  Margherita Scanò
 Patrizio Rispo as  Giacomo Onorato
 Mirco Petrini  as  Salvatore Terrasini
 Fabio Fulco  as  Davide Ruggeri
 Frank Crudele as Pietro Melluso
 Antonio Milo as Sante Lo Foco
 Giada Desideri as Elena Dapporto
 Myriam Catania as Gloria Lo Bianco
 Alessandro Lucente  as  Paolo Zannoni
 Davide Ricci  as  Luca Rebecchi
 Chiara Francini as  Marzia Meniconi
 Cosimo Cinieri  as  Luigi Cordari
 Eros Pagni  as  Carmine Amitrano
 Rosa Pianeta  as  Viviana Amitrano
 Tiziana Lodato  as  Sofia Amitrano 
 Angelo Infanti  as  Franco Leonetti
 Francesca Chillemi as  Verna Leonetti

See also
List of Italian television series

External links
 

Italian television series
RAI original programming